Platysmodes gambeyi is a species of beetle in the family Carabidae, the only species in the genus Platysmodes.

References

Pterostichinae